Anthemideae is a tribe of flowering plants in the family, Asteraceae, and the subfamily Asteroideae. They are distributed worldwide with concentrations in central Asia, the Mediterranean Basin, and southern Africa. Most species of plant known as chamomile belong to genera of this tribe. 

As of 2006 there were about 1800 species classified in 111 genera. In 2007 the tribe was divided into 14 subtribes, including Glebionidinae, the source of hybrid garden marguerites.

Genera

Anthemideae genera recognized by the Global Compositae Database as March 2022:

× Anthematricaria
× Anthemimatricaria
Aaronsohnia 
Achillea 
Adenanthellum 
Adenoglossa 
Ajania 
Ajaniopsis 
Allardia 
Anacyclus 
Anthemis 
Arctanthemum 
Argyranthemum 
Artemisia 
Artemisiella 
Athanasia 
Bellidiastrum 
Brachanthemum 
Brocchia 
Cancrinia 
Cancriniella 
Castrilanthemum 
Chamaemelum 
Chamomilla 
Chlamydophora 
Chrysanthemum 
Chrysanthoglossum 
Cladanthus 
Coleostephus 
Cota 
Cotula 
Crossostephium 
Cymbopappus 
Daveaua 
Elachanthemum 
Endopappus 
Eriocephalus 
Eumorphia 
Filifolium 
Foveolina 
Glebionis 
Glossopappus 
Gonospermum 
Gymnopentzia 
Handelia 
Heliocauta 
Heteranthemis 
Heteromera 
Hilliardia 
Hippia 
Hippolytia 
Hulteniella 
Hymenolepis 
Hymenostemma 
Inezia 
Inulanthera 
Ismelia 
Kaschgaria 
Lasiospermum 
Lepidolopha 
Lepidolopsis 
Lepidophorum 
Leptinella 
Leucanthemella 
Leucanthemopsis 
Leucanthemum 
Leucocyclus 
Leucoptera 
Lidbeckia 
Lonas 
Marasmodes 
Mataxa 
Matricaria 
Mauranthemum 
Mausolea 
Mecomischus 
Microcephala 
Myxopappus 
Nananthea 
Neopallasia 
Nipponanthemum 
Nivellea 
Oncosiphon 
Opisthopappus 
Osmitopsis 
Otanthus 
Otospermum 
Pentzia 
Phaeostigma 
Phalacrocarpum 
Phymaspermum 
Picrothamnus 
Plagius 
Polychrysum 
Prolongoa 
Pseudohandelia 
Rennera 
Rhetinolepis 
Rhodanthemum 
Richteria 
Santolina 
Schistostephium 
Sclerorhachis 
Soliva 
Sphaeromeria 
Stilpnolepis 
Tanacetopsis 
Tanacetum 
Thaminophyllum 
Trichanthemis 
Tridactylina 
Tripleurospermum 
Turaniphytum 
Tzvelevopyrethrum 
Ugamia 
Ursinia 
Xylanthemum

References

Further reading

de Cassini, A. (1818). Cassini on Compositae III. Journal de Physique, de Chimie et d'Histoire Naturelle 88 196.

 
Asteraceae tribes